A forza di sberle is a 1974 action comedy film directed by Bruno Corbucci.

Critical response 
A review in the Corriere della Sera praises the fact that the film does not take itself too seriously but regrets its lack of imagination.

References

External links

1974 films
1974 comedy films
Italian buddy comedy films
1970s Italian-language films
1970s Italian films
Films shot in Istanbul
Films set in Istanbul
Italian action comedy films
Italian multilingual films
Turkish multilingual films
Films directed by Bruno Corbucci